Flip-Flop is a Big Finish Productions audio drama based on the long-running British science fiction television series Doctor Who.

This audio drama is presented on two CDs, one white and the other black. The discs can be listened to in either order due to the construction of the plot.

Plot

Black disc
It is Christmas Eve, 3090, and the Seventh Doctor and Mel arrive on the planet Puxatornee searching for leptonite crystals to fight the Quarks. They discover a world where the human citizens are slowly becoming in thrall to the alien Slithergees.

White disc
It is Christmas Eve, 3090, and the Seventh Doctor and Mel arrive on the planet Puxatornee searching for leptonite crystals. They find the world a ruined radioactive wasteland.

Cast
The Doctor — Sylvester McCoy
Mel — Bonnie Langford
Mitchell — Richard Gibson
Slithergee Voices — Daniel Hogarth
Potter — Trevor Littledale
Stewart — Francis Magee
Professor Capra — Trevor Martin
Bailey — Pamela Miles
Reed — Audrey Schoellhammer

Notes
Puxatornee and the events in this strange episode loosely resemble the bizarre events in the "time-travel" Bill Murray movie Groundhog Day where the same day happens over and over again only to be changed by Bill Murray in the town of Punxsutawney, Pennsylvania.  The film takes place on Groundhog Day, another winter holiday.
The character names are references to the film It's a Wonderful Life, which also takes place at Christmas.  Characters in the film include Mr. Potter and the Bailey family; the film was directed by Frank Capra and starred James Stewart, Donna Reed and Thomas Mitchell, among others.

External links
Big Finish Productions – Flip-Flop

2003 audio plays
Seventh Doctor audio plays